The Women's 100 metres T12 event at the 2012 Summer Paralympics took place at the London Olympic Stadium on 1 and 2 September.

Results

Round 1
Competed 1 September 2012 from 10:15. Qual. rule: winner of each heat (Q) plus the 7 fastest other times (q) qualified.

Heat 1

Heat 2

Heat 3

Heat 4

Heat 5

Semifinals
Competed 1 September 2012 from 21:24. Qual. rule: winner of each heat (Q) plus best second place (q) qualified.

Heat 1

Heat 2

Heat 3

Final
Competed 2 September 2012 at 19:54.

 
Q = qualified by place. q = qualified by time. WR = World Record. RR = Regional Record. PB = Personal Best. SB = Seasonal Best.

References

Athletics at the 2012 Summer Paralympics
2012 in women's athletics
Women's sport in London